MIMOS Berhad (or MIMOS) is Malaysia's national applied research and development centre under the Ministry of Science, Technology And Innovation (MOSTI).

The company was founded as the Malaysian Institute of Microelectronic Systems in 1985, currently a public company wholly owned by Minister of Finance Incorporated (MoF Inc.).

MIMOS was established to initiate research and development (R&D) in Microelectronics in 1985 under the Prime Minister’s Department. Throughout its journey, MIMOS has evolved into the national Applied R&D Centre to be a catalyst of growth for the electrical and electronic industry and to realise the Nation’s Information and Communications Technology (ICT) vision propelling Malaysia into a high-technology country. 

MIMOS is a strategic agency under the Ministry of Science, Technology and Innovation (MOSTI) and a premier innovation centre in Semiconductors, Microelectronics, and ICT technologies, contributing to Malaysia’s socio-economic growth through patentable technology platforms, products, and solutions. Since its inception, MIMOS has filed more than 2,000 patents in various technology domains and across key socio-economic areas driving Malaysia’s digital transformation journey into the international arena, rebranding itself as MIMOS Global in 2022.

As a centre of research excellence, MIMOS oversees R&D centres focusing on Semiconductors for Future Electronics (CSFE), Microelectronics and Power Systems (CMAPS), Advanced Manufacturing for Future Industry (CAMFI), and Smart Nation technologies. The R&D on CSFE will enhance Malaysia's position in the global semiconductor value chain through homegrown technology infusion and strengthen existing semiconductor technology, increasing competitiveness and sustainability. The CMAPS R&D centre develops core electronic reference designs for creating domestic products that will be supporting critical requirements in relevant industries.  In addition, the CAMFI centre looks into enabling technologies to improve cost efficiency, productivity, quality and flexibility for local industries, and the Smart Nation centre focuses towards self-reliance on smart technology, the bedrock for nation-building and economic development.

MIMOS continuously enhance its collaborations with existing strategic partners, explore new opportunities with potential partners, and develop new technology companies and business-oriented technology venture organisations. It will also continue to conduct applied research and development of advanced technology, explore the development of global technopreneurship, and cultivate an attitude of trust, innovation and high performance.

See also
Grid fabric

References

External links 
 MIMOS Official Website

Government-owned companies of Malaysia
Science and technology in Malaysia
Computer companies of Malaysia
Research institutes in Malaysia
Companies based in Kuala Lumpur
Malaysian brands
Research institutes established in 1984
Companies established in 1984
1984 establishments in Malaysia
Ministry of Energy, Technology, Science, Climate Change and Environment (Malaysia)
Minister of Finance (Incorporated) (Malaysia)
Privately held companies of Malaysia